Abdul Mannan (1 January 1932 – 30 April 2007) was a Bangladeshi academic. He served as the 19th Vice-chancellor of the University of Dhaka.

Education and career
Mannan earned his master's in biochemistry from the University of Dhaka in 1955. In 1961, he joined the Department of Biochemistry as a lecturer and moved to the Department of Pharmacy in 1983.

Mannan was elected to serve as the Vice-Chancellor of the University of Dhaka from January 1986 until March 1990.

References

1932 births
2007 deaths
Mannan
Academic staff of the University of Dhaka
Vice-Chancellors of the University of Dhaka
People from Narsingdi District